Gleb Andreyevich Boglayevskiy (born 4 July 1986) is a former Russian football striker.

Club career
He made his senior debut for FC Amkar Perm on 6 July 2005 in the Russian Cup game against FC Lada Togliatti.

He made his debut in the Russian Football National League for FC Lada Togliatti on 17 August 2006 in a game against FC Ural Yekaterinburg.

References

1986 births
Sportspeople from Perm, Russia
Living people
Russian footballers
Association football forwards
FC Amkar Perm players
FC Lada-Tolyatti players